General elections were held in Niue on 23 February 1996.  Members of the Niue People's Party won 9 seats, with independents taking the other 11.  Premier Frank Lui retained his seat and position.

References

Elections in Niue
1996 elections in Oceania
1996 in Niue
February 1996 events in Oceania